One half (: halves) is the irreducible fraction resulting from dividing one by two  or the fraction resulting from dividing any number by its double. Multiplication by one half is equivalent to division by two, or "halving"; conversely, division by one half is equivalent to multiplication by two, or "doubling". One half often appears in mathematical equations, recipes, measurements, etc. Half can also be said to be one part of something divided into two equal parts.

For instance, the area S of a triangle is computed.

S =  × perpendicular height.

One half also figures in the formula for calculating figurate numbers, such as triangular numbers and pentagonal numbers:

and in the formula for computing magic constants for magic squares

One half has two different decimal expansions, the familiar 0.5 and the recurring 0.49999999... It has a similar pair of expansions in any even base. It is common to believe these expressions represent distinct numbers: see the proof that 0.999... equals 1 for a detailed discussion of a related case. In odd bases, one half has no terminating representation, only a single representation with a repeating fractional component, such as 0.11111111... in ternary.

Particularities in writing and language

 is also one of the few fractions to usually have a key of its own on typewriters (see fractions). It also has its own code point in some early extensions of ASCII at 171 (ABhex). In Unicode, it has its own code unit at U+00BD (decimal 189) in the C1 Controls and Latin-1 Supplement block and a cross-reference in the Number Forms block, rendering as "½."
The HTML entity is &frac12;. 

One half is also one of the few fractions which are commonly expressed in natural languages by suppletion rather than regular derivation: in English, for example, compare "one half" against other regular formations like "one-sixth".

It is acceptable to write one half as a hyphenated word, "one-half" or non-hyphenated, "one half".

Code points
In the Unicode standard, the symbol ½ has the code point
U+00BD ½ Vulgar Fraction One Half (HTML #0189· inherited from Latin-1)

PC entry 
 + (keeping Alt pressed until all 4 digits have been typed on the numeric keypad only)

See also
List of numbers
Division by two

References

Half
Rational numbers